Hashim bin Jasin is a Malaysian politician from the Malaysian Islamic Party (PAS), a component party of the Perikatan Nasional (PN) coalition. He has served as the 4th Spiritual Leader of PAS since October 2016 after the death of his predecessor Haron Din in September 2016 and its State Commissioner of Perlis from 1991 to 2013. Besides, he served as the Member of Parliament (MP) for Arau after his victory in the 1998 Arau by-election to the 1999 general election in November 1999 and Member of the Perlis State Legislative Assembly (MLA) for Sanglang from November 1999 to the 2013 General election in May 2013.

Education 
 Sekolah Melayu Jelampuk 
 Sekolah Alawiyah, Arau
 University of Baghdad, Iraq (Bachelor's degree of Arabic Literature and Islamic Law)

Political career

PAS stance on opposition pact
On 20 October 2016, Hashim Jasin emphasized that the Islamist party PAS will not collaborate with other political parties to topple the current Prime Minister Najib Razak’s government as this would not benefit him or the party. He mentioned that previous attempts in the past had proven failed. In the early 1990s, PAS joined forces with Parti Melayu Semangat 46 (S46) led by Tengku Razaleigh Hamzah, then teaming up with Democratic Action Party (DAP) & People's Justice Party (PKR) to form Barisan Alternatif (BA) in 1998 and subsequently Pakatan Rakyat (PR) in 2008. Hashim stressed that PAS would like to take charge of the opposition pact, rather than follow.

Better to be with Umno than with ‘anti-Islam’ DAP'
On 6 February 2017, PAS top leader Hashim Jasin said the party will choose ‘oppressive’ Umno over ‘anti-Islam’ DAP anytime. He said PAS was cooperating with Umno and Barisan Nasional (BN) because the Malay-based party can still be relied on compared to other “anti-Islam” parties. He said PAS’ approach was in line with the “mature politics” advocated by Prophet Muhammad.

Controversy 
In 2013, when Hashim Jasin was the then Perlis PAS commissioner, it was exposed that he owned a Porsche Cayman. He explained that the car was belongs to his son which was bought with approximate price RM100,000 from England using the Approved Permit which was reserved to him as a state assemblyman.

In 2016, Hashim Jasin said that PAS unlikely to receive RM90 million, since he is driving a Proton Saga and lives in a home worth only RM60,000. He said that if PAS had RM100 million, he could have even built three swimming pools.

Honour 
 :
 Knight Commander of the Order of Prince Syed Sirajuddin Jamalullail of Perlis (DPSJ) – Dato' (2018)

References 

1939 births
Living people
Malaysian Islamic Party politicians
University of Baghdad alumni